'Kitaw Ejigu; 25 February 1948 – 13 January 2006) was an Ethiopian American scientist and politician who served as chief of spacecraft and satellite systems engineer for NASA for four decades. With his co-workers, Kitaw invented spacecraft and rockets to support Planetary Science Research and Exploration. He was also among scientists who invented Flight Dynamic Simulator, Advanced Global Positioning Satellite System, and  Aerospace Rocket mechanics. Before his journey to the United States, he worked as Chief technical advisor and assistant manager for Ethiopian Automotive Services and Sales Company. He was the first Ethiopian Aerospace scientist. Kitaw died on 13 January 2006 after suffering from stroke on 8 January 2006.

Early life 
Kitaw was born in Bonga( ) , Keffa province, Ethiopia in 25 February 1948 from his father Ejigu Haile and mother Askale Belayneh. After completing his primary and secondary education in Bonga, Waka and Jimma, Kitaw attended his higher education at the Polytechnic College of Ethiopia, in Bahir Dar in the department of Mechanical engineering and in 1966 he graduated as the top student in his class.

In 1972, Kitaw went to Japan after winning a scholarship that was provided by the Japanese Overseas Technical Association, and studied Automotive engineering, and Language and Economics at Hiroshima University and Osaka University respectively. Later, in 1973, Kitaw received a scholarship to the United States, where he had received a Master of Arts in Business administration and Doctor of Philosophy in Aerospace engineering.

Career 
In 1967, after his graduation from the former Polytechnic College, now Bahir Dar Institute of Technology, Kitaw became Chief technical advisor and assistant manager for Ethiopian Automotive Services and Sales Company and served for two years. Following his scholarship to United States, Kitaw had an opportunity to be employed in NASA and became the first Ethiopian aerospace scientist.This information is neither proved from NASA nor his families were able to prove it. Kitaw served in NASA as Chief of Spacecraft and Satellite Systems engineer and invented spacecraft and rockets to support Planetary Science Research and Exploration.

In 1978, Kitaw invented two aerospace mechanisms, which were patented under NASA's new technologies program, while working with NASA's other scientist and Apollo astronaut Buzz Aldrin, second person to walk on the Moon. Also he invented Flight Dynamic Simulator and Advanced Global Positioning Satellite System for Boeing with his co-workers, and worked as a Space Technology and System Research scientist for this company. Later, Kitaw also worked as a scientist and engineer for Loral Corp and Rockwell International.

In 2000s, he went to his homeland Ethiopia and did all his best to introduce technology based development. Kitaw established a privately owned satellite and related systems engineering company that he called Trans Tech International, a global technologies service systems. Also he served as its Chief executive officer until his death on 12 January 2006.

In 2002, and in his later years, Kitaw became a politician and founded a political party named the Ethiopian National United Front.

Personal life and death

References 

American people of Ethiopian descent
2006 deaths
Ethiopian scientists
American scientists
NASA people
Ethiopian politicians
Keffa
1948 births